Thibie is a commune in north-eastern France, situated in the Marne department in the region of Grand Est.

History
The name is attested as Thetbiacum (805), Tibiacum (1107), Thebeium (1153), and Thiebye (1254). The name originates from "Thiepo", a Germanic name, and the suffix "iacum", from Latin denoting ownership.

A decree from Charles the Bald in 805 confirms the right of the Châlons church to demand tithes from the people of Thibie. The owner of the Chalons Cathedral became owner of the lands of Thibie by 1639.

Geography
The source of the Gironde estuary empties into a tributary of the left bank of Marne in Saint-Gibrien after 10 km.

See also
Communes of the Marne department

References

Communes of Marne (department)